Guy Coquille (1523–1603), also called Conchyleus, was a French jurist.

He studied the humanities in the Collège de Navarre, Paris, from 1532 to 1539, and then law in Padua and Orléans. Coquille took up the practice of law in Paris in 1550, and moved to Nevers in 1559, where he worked as an advocate for the Parlement. He represented the Third Estate of his province in the States-General of 1560, 1576 and 1588, and served as procureur fiscal of the Duke of Nevers from 1571 on.

Coquille's writings were all published posthumously. They include the Institutions au droit des Francois, ou Nouvelle Conférence des Coutumes de France (1607) and the Questions et responses sur les Coutumes de France (1611). These works attempted to cover the laws of France comprehensively without respect to their origin in the common law or in Roman law, a novel approach that first emerged in the legal writing of 16th century France, and later in that of other European countries as well.

References

 
 Guy Thuillier, Guy Coquille et les auteurs nivernais du XVIème siècle, Nevers : Bibliothèque Municipale de Nevers : Société Académique du Nivernais, 2003
 Nicolas Warembourg, Guy Coquille et le droit français : Le droit commun coutumier dans la doctrine juridique du XVIè siècle, 2005, 864 p.

16th-century French lawyers
University of Paris alumni
University of Padua alumni
1523 births
1603 deaths
Ancien Régime office-holders